John Bridges (1536–1618) was an English bishop.

Life
Born in 1536, he graduated M.A. at Pembroke Hall, Cambridge in 1560, having been a Fellow there since 1556. He became Dean of Salisbury in 1577.

He was appointed Bishop of Oxford on the accession of James I of England, and took part in the Hampton Court Conference, in 1604.

Works
A Defence of the Government Established in the Church of England for Ecclesiastical Matters (1587) was a controversial work, expanded to 1400 pages from a Paul's Cross sermon, aimed at the theories of church polity of Thomas Cartwright, Laurence Chaderton and Walter Travers in defence of the current Church of England settlement. It brought replies by Dudley Fenner and Travers. It also provoked the first of the tracts by Martin Marprelate, Oh read over D. John Bridges ... Printed at the cost and charges of M. Marprelate gentleman (1588).

He was formerly considered a possible author of Gammer Gurton's Needle, now attributed to William Stevenson.

Quotes
He is known to have coined the phrase, "a fool and his money are soon parted," originally written in the 1587 Defence treatise.

Notes

1536 births
1618 deaths
Deans of Salisbury
Bishops of Oxford
Alumni of Pembroke College, Cambridge
Fellows of Pembroke College, Cambridge
17th-century Church of England bishops
17th-century Anglican theologians
16th-century Anglican theologians